Carlos Osvaldo Fernández Maldonando (born 1 November 1984) is a Peruvian retired footballer who played as a midfielder.

Club career
Carlos Fernández started his senior career with Alianza Lima, making his Torneo Descentralizado debut in 2002 season with them.

In January 2006 Fernández joined Cienciano. In his first season with Cienciano he made 39 appearances with 2 goals, and in his last he only managed to play in 7 matches in the 2007 Descentralizado season.

Then In January 2009 he signed for Universidad San Martín.

References

External links
 
 

1984 births
Living people
Footballers from Lima
Peruvian footballers
Peru international footballers
Peruvian Primera División players
Club Alianza Lima footballers
Estudiantes de Medicina footballers
Cienciano footballers
Club Deportivo Universidad de San Martín de Porres players
Alianza Atlético footballers
Association football midfielders